The Green Party of Switzerland is a green political party in Switzerland. It is the fourth-largest party in the National Council of Switzerland and the largest party that is not represented on the Federal Council.

History
The first Green party in Switzerland was founded as a local party in 1971 in the town of Neuchâtel. In 1979, Daniel Brélaz was elected to the National Council as the first Green MP on the national level (in Switzerland and in the world). Local and regional Green parties and organisations were founded in many different towns and cantons in the following years.

In 1983, two different national green party federations were created: in May, diverse local green groups came together in Fribourg to form the Federation of Green Parties of Switzerland, and in June, some left-alternative groups formed the Green Alternative Party of Switzerland in Bern. In 1990, an attempt to combine these organisations failed. Afterward, some of the member groups from the Green Alternative Party joined the Federation of Green Parties which has become the de facto national Green party. In 1993, the Federation of Green Parties changed its name to the Green Party of Switzerland.

In 1986, the first two Green members of a cantonal government become members of the Regierungsrat of Bern.

In 1987, the Green Party of Switzerland joined the European Federation of Green Parties.

In the 1990s, members of the Green Party became town mayors, members of the high court and even president of a cantonal government (Verena Diener in 1999).

In 2007, the centrist wing of the party split away and formed the Green Liberal Party of Switzerland.

Policies

The traditional emphases of the party's policies lie in environmentalism and green means of transportation. In terms of foreign policy, the greens set out on the course of openness and pacifism. In economic policy, the greens are centre-left. The majority of greens support an accession of Switzerland to the European Union. In immigration policy, the greens support further integration initiatives for immigrants. The greens support measures to increase energy efficiency, oppose nuclear power, and support raising energy and fuel prices. According to their policy, the resulting revenues should be allocated to social security spending.

Popular support

National Council and Council of States

On the national level, in 2003 the Green Party was not represented in the Council of States or Federal Council. In 2007, two Green Party members were elected to the Council of States.

By 2005, the party held 3.8 percent of the seats in the Swiss cantonal executive governments and 6.9 percent in the Swiss cantonal parliaments (index "BADAC", weighted with the population and number of seats). In 2007, the Green Party was represented in the governments of the cantons Bern, Basel-City, Geneva (two ministers), Neuchâtel, Nidwalden, Vaud, Zug (two ministers) and Zurich.

Party strength over time

1.* indicates that the party was not on the ballot in this canton.
2.Part of the Canton of Bern until 1979.

Party presidents
This is an incomplete list of the presidents of the Green Party since 1990:

 Irène Gardiol (1990-1992)
 Verena Diener (1992-1995)
 Hanspeter Thur (1995-1997)
 Ruedi Baumann (1997-2001)
 Patrice Mugny (co-president; 2001-2004)
 Ruth Genner (2001–2008; co-president until 2004)
 Ueli Leuenberger (2008–2012)
 Adèle Thorens Goumaz (co-president; 2012–2016)
 Regula Rytz (2012–2020; co-president until 2016)
 Balthasar Glättli (2020–present)

See also 
 Green party
 Green politics
 Environmental movement in Switzerland
 List of environmental organizations

Notes and references

External links

Official website 
Official website 
Official website 
Swiss Greens International
 

 
Green political parties in Switzerland
Non-interventionist parties
Switzerland
Swiss Climate Alliance